The Caterham CT03 is a Formula One racing car designed by Mark Smith and Lewis Butler for the Caterham F1 team. It was used during the 2013 Formula One season, where it was driven by Charles Pic and Giedo van der Garde. The car was unveiled on the eve of testing for the 2013 season at the Circuito de Jerez.

Design
The first chassis was assembled in early October 2012, completed on 30 January and launched on 5 February. The CT03 aroused controversy during pre-season testing. Lotus technical director James Allison observed details of the car's exhaust outlet that he believed contravened Article 5.8.4 of the technical regulations, that prohibits the use of bodywork within a defined area with respect to the exhaust outlet. The FIA later deemed this system to be illegal. After driving the car during FP1 at Bahrain, Heikki Kovalainen stated the car was basically the previous year's car with nothing done to it.

After the initial three races of the season the CT03 received a major upgrade to improve handling and performance. The most noticeable part of this was the introduction of a vanity panel over the stepped-nose. Later in the season the vanity panel was removed again and the car was raced for the rest of the season without it.

Livery
Caterham F1 went into the 2013 season with livery changes. The white-yellow-white stripe in the front section was replaced by solid green with white accent as Caterham F1's main colour while the white-yellow stripe on the rear section was also retained. The green became brighter unlike previous seasons when dark green was the team's main colour.

Complete Formula One results
(key) (results in bold indicate pole position; results in italics indicate fastest lap)

References

External links

 

CT03